Mimachlamys sanguinea is a bivalve in the family Pectinidae.

<div align=center>

</div align=center>
<div align=center>

</div align=center>
<div align=center>

</div align=center>
<div align=center>

</div align=center>

References

Pectinidae